Postmates is a food delivery service, founded in 2011, and acquired by Uber in 2020. It offers local delivery of restaurant-prepared meals and other goods. It is headquartered in San Francisco, California. 

, Postmates operates in 2,940 U.S. cities. Postmates primarily competes with Grubhub, DoorDash, and its sister service Uber Eats. 

The company has been criticized for antitrust price manipulation.

History
Postmates was founded in 2011 by Bastian Lehmann, Sean Plaice, and Sam Street. 

In December 2014, Postmates opened its application programming interface to merchants to allow small businesses to compete in the business of consumer goods delivery with larger companies such as Amazon. 

In November 2017, Postmates launched service in Mexico City, its first location outside the United States. It ceased operations in Mexico in December 2019, citing a lack of growth and a desire to focus more on the U.S. market. In 2018, Postmates launched service in 134 new cities in the United States, bringing its total number of cities in the United States up to 550.

On December 13, 2018, Postmates announced the development of an autonomous delivery rover.

Funding and acquisition 
In 2011, Postmates raised over US$800,000 through involvement with the Angelpad accelerator. 

In September 2018, Postmates announced that it had raised  in additional funding, led by Tiger Global Management.

In January 2019, Postmates raised  in investments from BlackRock together with Spark Capital, Founders Fund, Uncork Capital, and Slow Ventures. The total valuation of the company reached .

Criticism

Pay structure 
In May 2019, Postmates changed its pay structure for delivery workers, removing a $4-per-job minimum pay guarantee, changing the base rate per job, and decreasing the per-mile rate in some markets. Working Washington, a labor activism group affiliated with the SEIU labor union, urged couriers to refuse jobs with Postmates. The company defended its modified pay structure, citing improved efficiency and its policy of allowing workers to keep all tips without counting them against other compensation.

Allegations of monopolistic behavior
In April 2020, a group of New York residents sued DoorDash, GrubHub, Postmates, and Uber Eats, accusing them of abusing their market power by only listing restaurants on their apps if the restaurant owners signed contracts which include clauses that require prices be the same for dine-in customers as for customers receiving delivery. The plaintiffs stated that this arrangement increases the cost for dine-in customers, as they are required to subsidize the cost of delivery; and that the apps charge “exorbitant” fees, which range from 13% to 40% of revenue, while the average restaurant’s profit ranges from 3% to 9% of revenue. The lawsuit seeks triple damages, including for overcharges, since April 14, 2016 for dine-in and delivery customers in the United States at restaurants using the defendants’ delivery apps. The case is filed in the federal U.S. District Court, Southern District of New York as Davitashvili v GrubHub Inc., 20-cv-3000. A trial date has not yet been set. In March 2022, U. S. District Judge Lewis A. Kaplan  denied defendants' motion to dismiss.

References

External links 
 

2011 establishments in California
Online food retailers of the United States
Companies based in San Francisco
Logistics companies of the United States
Transport companies established in 2011
American companies established in 2011
Retail companies established in 2011
Internet properties established in 2011
Online food ordering
2020 mergers and acquisitions
Transportation companies based in California
Uber acquisitions